Templewko  is a village in the administrative district of Gmina Bledzew, within Międzyrzecz County, Lubusz Voivodeship, in western Poland.

The village has a population of 59.

References

Templewko